Mishan Rural District is a rural district (dehestan) in Mahvarmilani District, Mamasani County, Fars Province, Iran. At the 2006 census, its population was 4,301, in 990 families.  The rural district has 78 villages.

References 

Rural Districts of Fars Province
Mamasani County